XM 5 may refer to:

 XM-5, a satellite operated by XM satellite radio
 XM 5, a radio channel from Sirus XM satellite radio; see List of Sirius XM Radio channels
 XM5, former name for the U.S. Army XM7 assault rifle

See also

 
 
 XMS (disambiguation)
 XMV (disambiguation)
 XM (disambiguation)